Sextus Calpurnius Agricola was a Roman senator and general active during the 2nd century. He was consul suffectus with Tiberius Claudius Julianus for the nundinium of September-October 154. Agricola is known primarily from inscriptions.

Life 
No information has yet been found about Calpurnius Agricola prior to his consulate. His origin is attested in no surviving document, and the gentilicium "Calpurnius" is commonly found all over the Empire. However, Anthony Birley notes the combination "Sextus Calpurnius" is very uncommon, and he suggests that Agricola is related to Fronto's friend Sextus Calpurnius Julianus; if so, he may have been a native of Cirta or another town in Numidia.

Calpurnius Agricola was governor of Germania Superior around 158.

In 161 or 162 he was made governor of Britain and remained until at least 163, possibly until the end of the 160s.

In 163, he was sent to Britain to control uprisings in the north. He rebuilt a number of forts, most notably that at Coria (Corbridge). He withdrew troops southwards from Scotland towards the line of Hadrian's Wall to contend with the threats of further rebellion.

There are indications of unrest in Britain around the time of his rule attested by damage to the forum at Viroconium Cornoviorum (Wroxeter) and the burning of a large part of Verulamium (St Albans).

Around 166 AD Agricola was appointed imperial legate in Roman Dacia. Between 168 and 169, he was one of the governors of Lower Moesia.

Notes

Sources

Epigraphics
 PIR C 249
 CIL VII, 226
 RIB I, 1137

Secondary
 Patricia Southern, Roman Britain: A New History 55BC - AD 450

 

Calpurnius Agricola, Sextus
Ancient Roman generals
2nd-century Romans
Roman governors of Lower Moesia
Roman governors of Germania Inferior
Roman governors of Dacia
Suffect consuls of Imperial Rome
Agricola, Sextus
Generals of Lucius Verus
Generals of Marcus Aurelius